The Little Fool is a 1921 American silent drama film directed by Phil Rosen and starring Milton Sills, Frances Wadsworth and Nigel Barrie.

Cast
 Milton Sills as Dick 
 Frances Wadsworth as Florence 
 Nigel Barrie as Evan 
 Ora Carew
 
 Peggy Prevost 
 Helen Howard

References

Bibliography
 James Robert Parish & Michael R. Pitts. Film directors: a guide to their American films. Scarecrow Press, 1974.

External links

1921 films
1921 drama films
Silent American drama films
Films directed by Phil Rosen
American silent feature films
1920s English-language films
Metro Pictures films
American black-and-white films
Films based on works by Jack London
1920s American films